The Gyöngyös Synagogue is a large Jewish religious structure in Gyöngyös, Hungary.

History 
The large, domed synagogue was built in 1930 according to the plans of Lipót Baumhorn and his son-in-law György Somogyi in an eclectic style decorated with medieval European and Eastern elements. The large building was severely dilapidated by the beginning of the 21st century and is currently being renovated. It no longer has a religious function, but is intended to serve as a venue for cultural programs in the future.

Gallery

Sources 
 https://turizmus.com/desztinaciok/felujitas-utan-turisztikai-latvanyossag-lesz-a-gyongyosi-zsinagoga-1155719
 (szerk.) Gerő László: Magyarországi zsinagógák, Műszaki Könyvkiadó, Budapest, 1989, 

Synagogues in Hungary
20th-century synagogues